Chemosensor may refer to:

 Chemoreceptor, a specialized sensory receptor cell which transduces (responds to) a chemical substance
 Molecular sensor, a molecule that interacts with an analyte to produce a detectable change